Studenca (in older sources also Studenec) is a small dispersed settlement in the hills northeast of Kamnik in the Upper Carniola region of Slovenia. It includes the hamlets of Spodnja Studenca, Zgornja Studenca, and Zabreznik.

References

External links

Studenca on Geopedia

Populated places in the Municipality of Kamnik